Planina may refer to: 

In Croatia:
Planina Donja, part of Zagreb

In Serbia:
Planina (Krupanj), a settlement in the Municipality of Krupanj

In Slovenia:
Planina, Ajdovščina, a settlement in the Municipality of Ajdovščina
Planina, Ivančna Gorica, a settlement in the Municipality of Ivančna Gorica
Planina, Kostel, a settlement in the Municipality of Kostel
Planina, Ljubno, a settlement in the Municipality of Ljubno
Planina, Postojna, a settlement in the Municipality of Postojna
Planina, Semič, a settlement in the Municipality of Semič
Planina na Pohorju, a settlement in the Municipality of Zreče
Planina nad Horjulom, a settlement in the Municipality of Dobrova–Polhov Gradec
Planina pod Golico, a settlement in the Municipality of Jesenice
Planina pod Šumikom, a settlement in the Municipality of Slovenska Bistrica
Planina pri Cerknem, a settlement in the Municipality of Cerkno
Planina pri Raki, a settlement in the Municipality of Krško
Planina pri Sevnici, a settlement in the Municipality of Šentjur
Planina v Podbočju, a settlement in the Municipality of Krško
Podplanina, a settlement in the Municipality of Loški Potok, formerly known as Planina
Sveta Planina, a settlement in the Municipality of Trbovlje
Sveti Anton na Pohorju, a settlement in the Municipality of Radlje ob Dravi (named Planina from 1955 to 1993)
Planina Cave, a cave in Inner Carniola